Bilchiragh (also transliterated as Belcherãgh), is a district in the southern part of Faryab province, Afghanistan.

References

External links
 Map of Settlements AIMS, May 2002

Districts of Faryab Province